The 73rd Infantry Division (73-ya Pekhotnaya Diviziya) was an infantry formation of the Russian Imperial Army.

Organization
1st Brigade
289th Infantry Regiment
290th Infantry Regiment
2nd Brigade
291st Infantry Regiment
292nd Infantry Regiment

References

Infantry divisions of the Russian Empire